</noinclude>

Burringurrah (also referred to as Mt Augustus) is a medium-sized Aboriginal community, located in the Gascoyne region of Western Australia, within the Shire of Upper Gascoyne. The inselberg also once known as Mount Augustus is situated nearby.

History
The community is situated on a  reserve that was excised from the Mount James pastoral lease. It was incorporated in 1999.

The community store had to close in 2011 saying that the transient population made the business non-viable. The remote CMS had taken over the store in 2009 and had kept it running until 2011 despite closing for a short while from seasonal flooding.

The 2011 floods had isolated the community for a few weeks and it was not until nearly a year later, in early 2012, that all basic services were returned to the town.

Native title 
The community is located within the registered area of the Wajarri Yamatji (WAD6033/98) native title claim.

Governance 
The community is managed through its incorporated body, Burringurrah Community (Aboriginal Corporation), incorporated under the Aboriginal Councils and Associations Act 1976 on 9 September 1987.

Town planning 
Burringurrah Layout Plan No.2 has been prepared in accordance with State Planning Policy 3.2 Aboriginal Settlements. Layout Plan No.2 was endorsed by the community on 16 February 1999 and the Western Australian Planning Commission WAPC on 21 October 2003. The Layout Plan map-set and background report can be viewed at Planning Western Australia's website.

References

External links
 Planning Western Australia's official site – Burringurrah (Mt Augustus) Layout Plan (https://www.dplh.wa.gov.au/information-and-services/state-planning/aboriginal-communities/aboriginal-community-maps/layout-plans)

Shire of Upper Gascoyne
Aboriginal communities in Western Australia